The 1993 Eurocard Open was a men's ATP tennis tournament played on indoor carpet courts at the Hanns-Martin-Schleyer-Halle in Stuttgart, Germany that was part of the Championship Series of the 1993 ATP Tour. It was the fourth edition of the tournament and was held from 15 February until 21 February 1993. Sixth-seeded Michael Stich won the singles title.

Finals

Singles

 Michael Stich defeated  Richard Krajicek, 4–6, 7–5, 7–6(7–4), 3–6, 7–5
 It was Stich's 1st singles title of the year and 8th of his career.

Doubles

 Mark Kratzmann /  Wally Masur defeated  Steve DeVries /  David Macpherson, 6–3, 7–6

References

External links
 ITF tournament edition details

Eurocard Open
Euro